An Anthology of Chance Operations (An Anthology) was an artist's book publication from the early 1960s of experimental neodada art and music composition that used John Cage–inspired indeterminacy. It was edited by La Monte Young and DIY co-published in 1963 by Young and Jackson Mac Low in New York City. Its full title is: An Anthology of chance operations concept art anti-art indeterminacy improvisation meaningless work natural disasters plans of action stories diagrams Music poetry essays dance constructions mathematics compositions.

Legacy
The project became the manifestation of the original impetus for establishing Fluxus.   

In autumn 1960 the editor of the magazine Beatitude magazine approached Young and Mac Low after a reading and asked them if they would guest-edit an issue of the East Coast edition of his magazine, Beatitude East. Given free rein to include whoever and whatever he wanted, Young collected a large body of new and experimental music, anti art, poetry, essays and performance scores from America, Europe and Japan. The magazine, however, folded after only one issue, and the materials that Young had collected were never published until An Anthology of Chance Operations.

In June 1961 George Maciunas, who had already begun plans to publish a magazine in the autumn of the same year, designed the book's layout and title pages, while others, including Mac Low, produced the typescript for the works themselves.

Although it can be argued that An Anthology is not strictly a Fluxus publication, its development and production was a central event in the formation of Fluxus. It was the first collaborative publication project between people who were to become part of Fluxus: Young (editor and co-publisher), Mac Low (co-publisher) and Maciunas (designer).

The art dealer Heiner Friedrich issued a second edition in 1970.

Participants

 George Brecht
 Claus Bremer
 Earle Brown
 Joseph Byrd
 John Cage
 David Degener
 Walter De Maria
 Henry Flynt
 Yoko Ono
 Dick Higgins
 Toshi Ichiyanagi
 Terry Jennings
 Ray Johnson
 Jackson Mac Low
 Richard Maxfield
 Robert Morris created a piece for the first edition but just prior to publication withdrew his contribution.
 Malka Safro
 Simone Forti
 Nam June Paik
 Terry Riley
 Dieter Roth
 James Waring
 Emmett Williams
 Christian Wolff
 La Monte Young

References

External links
 An Anthology of Chance Operations PDF

American art
Artists' books
Conceptual art
Culture of New York City
Fluxus
Fluxworks